The 1998 Pilot Pen International was a tennis tournament played on outdoor hard courts at the Cullman-Heyman Tennis Center in New Haven, Connecticut, in the United States that was part of the International Series Gold of the 1998 ATP Tour and of Tier II of the 1998 WTA Tour. The men's tournament was held from August 17 through August 23, 1998, while the women's tournament was held from August 24 through August 30, 1998. Karol Kučera and Steffi Graf won the singles titles.

Finals

Men's singles

 Karol Kučera defeated  Goran Ivanišević 6–4, 5–7, 6–2
 It was Kučera's 2nd title of the year and the 4th of his career.

Women's singles

 Steffi Graf defeated  Jana Novotná 6–4, 6–1
 It was Graf's 1st title of the year and the 115th of her career.

Men's doubles

 Wayne Arthurs /  Peter Tramacchi defeated  Sébastien Lareau /  Alex O'Brien 7–6, 1–6, 6–3
 It was Arthurs' 2nd title of the year and the 4th of his career. It was Tramacchi's only title of the year and the 1st of his career.

Women's doubles

 Alexandra Fusai /  Nathalie Tauziat defeated  Mariaan de Swardt /  Jana Novotná 6–1, 6–0
 It was Fusai's 3rd title of the year and the 7th of her career. It was Tauziat's 3rd title of the year and the 21st of her career.

References

External links
 Official website
 ATP Tournament Profile
 WTA Tournament Profile

 
Pilot Pen International
Pilot Pen International
Volvo International
Pilot Pen International
Pilot Pen International
Pilot Pen International